Dominican football may refer to:
Football in the Dominican Republic
Football in Dominica